Several engagements near the port of Cádiz in Spain are known as the Battle of Cádiz:
Drake's attack on Cádiz in 1587: an English naval force under Francis Drake successfully attacked the port during the Anglo-Spanish War (1585–1604). 
Capture of Cádiz (1596): a successful naval raid Anglo-Dutch by Charles Howard and Robert Devereux during the Anglo-Spanish War (1585–1604).
Battle of the Gulf of Cadiz (1604): two Spanish ships under Antonio de Oquendo defeat two English ships during the Anglo-Spanish War (1585–1604).
Cádiz expedition (1625): an unsuccessful naval raid by an Anglo-Dutch force under the Duke of Buckingham during the Anglo-Spanish War (1625–1630).
Battle of Cádiz (1640): a French squadron led by Armand de Maillé-Brézé attacked a Spanish convoy during the Thirty Years' War.
Battle of Cádiz (1656): an English fleet destroyed and captured a Spanish treasure fleet during the Anglo-Spanish War (1654–1660).
Battle of Cádiz (1669): the English ship Mary Rose under John Kempthorne repelled an Algerian squadron of seven ships.
Battle of Cádiz (1702): an Anglo-Dutch naval force under George Rooke was repelled by the Spanish Francisco de Villadarias during the War of the Spanish Succession.
Blockade of Cadiz (1762): a British fleet prevented the departure of Spanish ships from the port to the Spanish colonies during the Anglo-Spanish War (1762–63).
Blockade of Cádiz (1797): the operation of the British fleet under John Jervis is repelled by the Spanish José de Mazarredo during the Anglo-Spanish War (1796–1802).
Siege of Cádiz (1810–1812): the French Army is forced to lift the siege of the port by the combined forces of the Spanish, British and Portuguese during the Peninsular War.
Siege of Cádiz (1823): the Spanish liberal forces in the port surrender to the French Army and the Spanish royalists during the French invasion of Spain in 1823.
Bombardments of Cádiz (1936): carried out by ships of the republican faction during the Spanish Civil War.